"Guilty Until Proven Innocent" is the third and final single from rapper Jay-Z's 2000 album The Dynasty: Roc La Familia. It features production by Rockwilder and a chorus sung by R. Kelly. The song's title flips the legal declaration "innocent until proven guilty" and its lyrics follow suit. Jay-Z's lyrics deal with how the press villainized Jay-Z by accusing him of stabbing his once business partner Lance Rivera on December 2, 1999. Jay-Z later pled guilty to stabbing Rivera and was sentenced to 3 years probation for the incident. "Guilty Until Proven Innocent" is also one of the first collaborations between Jay-Z and R. Kelly before they released two albums together.

On June 12, 2001—three months after the release of the "Guilty Until Proven Innocent" single—a DVD named The Making of Guilty Until Proven Innocent was released. The DVD helps explain the making of the Paul Hunter-directed music video that shows R. Kelly and Jay-Z rapping in court.

Buckshot and 9th Wonder sampled this song on their Food for Thought song from the album Chemistry in 2005.

Music video
The music video for this song is directed by Paul Hunter. R. Kelly and Jay-Z do not have a scene where they are together in this video, but separate scenes.

Formats and track listings

CD
 "Guilty Until Proven Innocent" (Radio Edit)
 "Guilty Until Proven Innocent" (Album Version)
 "Change the Game"
 "Guilty Until Proven Innocent" (Enhanced Video)

Vinyl
A-side
 "Guilty Until Proven Innocent" (Radio Edit)
 "Guilty Until Proven Innocent" (LP Version)
 "Guilty Until Proven Innocent" (Instrumental)

B-side
 "1-900-HUSTLER" (Radio Edit)
 "1-900-HUSTLER" (LP Version)
 "1-900-HUSTLER" (Instrumental)

Charts

See also
List of songs recorded by Jay-Z

References

2001 singles
Jay-Z songs
R. Kelly songs
Music videos directed by Paul Hunter (director)
Songs written by R. Kelly
Song recordings produced by R. Kelly
Songs written by Jay-Z
Songs written by Rockwilder
Roc-A-Fella Records singles
2000 songs
Song recordings produced by Rockwilder